is a Japanese former baseball outfielder and manager. Naka played with the Chunichi Dragons from 1955 to 1972, and later managed the team from 1978 to 1980. He led the Central League with a .343 batting average in 1967.

External links
Baseball-Reference

1936 births
Living people
Baseball people from Gunma Prefecture
Japanese baseball players
Nippon Professional Baseball outfielders
Chunichi Dragons players
Managers of baseball teams in Japan
Chunichi Dragons managers